The Housemartins were an English indie rock group formed in Hull who were active in the 1980s and charted three top-ten albums and six top-twenty singles in the UK. Many of their lyrics conveyed a mixture of socialist politics and Christianity, reflecting the beliefs of the band (the back cover of their debut album, London 0 Hull 4, contained the message, "Take Jesus – Take Marx – Take Hope"). The group's a cappella cover version of "Caravan of Love" (originally by Isley-Jasper-Isley) was a UK Number 1 single in December 1986.

After breaking up in 1988, Paul Heaton and Dave Hemingway formed The Beautiful South, while bassist Norman Cook became an electronic dance music DJ and music producer, founding the groups Beats International, Pizzaman, and Freak Power, before rebranding himself as Fatboy Slim.

Career

The band was formed in late 1983 by Paul Heaton (vocals) and Stan Cullimore (guitar), initially as a busking duo. Throughout his tenure with the band, Heaton billed himself as "P.d. Heaton".   Heaton and Cullimore recorded a demo tape with Ingo Dewsnap and Sharon Green of Les Zeiga Fleurs which brought them to the attention of Go! Discs. They then expanded by recruiting Ted Key (bass), former guitarist with The Gargoyles. Their first live performance as a band was at Hull University in October 1984. The band's membership changed considerably over the years. Key left at the end of 1985 and was replaced by Norman Cook (later known as Fatboy Slim). Drummer Chris Lang was replaced  briefly by Dodger (Roger Wilde) on loan from local Hull band 3-Action! for their first few gigs as a 4 piece then by Hugh Whitaker, former drummer with the Gargoyles, who in turn was replaced with Dave Hemingway. The band often referred to themselves as "the fourth best band in Hull", with the best three bands being Red Guitars, Everything but the Girl, and the Gargoyles.

In 1986, having recorded two John Peel sessions, the band broke through with their third single "Happy Hour", which reached No. 3 in the UK Singles Chart. The single's success was helped by a claymation animated pop promo of a type that was in vogue at the time, featuring a cameo by television comedian Phill Jupitus, who toured with the band under his stage name of "Porky the Poet".  Their debut album, London 0 Hull 4, was released later in 1986 and contained their previous two singles as well as alternative versions of first single "Flag Day" and follow-up to Happy Hour, "Think for a Minute". At the end of 1986 they had their only UK No. 1 single on 16 December with a cover version of Isley-Jasper-Isley's "Caravan of Love".  "Caravan of Love" was first performed by the band in their second Peel session in April 1986, prior to their initial chart success. At Peel's suggestion, the band then recorded another session (under the name the Fish City Five), consisting entirely of a cappella performances, and on at least one occasion (at The Tower nightclub in Hull, the same concert at which they were filmed as the Housemartins for the BBC programme, Rock Around the Clock), played support act for their own performance under this alternative name.  The "Caravan of Love" single featured four a cappella gospel songs on the B-side.

The Housemartins' second album The People Who Grinned Themselves to Death was released in September 1987, and included their two previous singles "Five Get Over Excited" and "Me and the Farmer". A third single from the album, "Build", was released in November; a Peel Session from the same month provided a recording used for their last single "There Is Always Something There to Remind Me" in 1988. A farewell compilation album, Now That's What I Call Quite Good was released later that year.

The band split in 1988, but the members have remained in contact and have worked on each other's projects. Norman Cook has enjoyed significant success with Beats International and then as Fatboy Slim, while Heaton, Hemingway and roadie Sean Welch formed the Beautiful South. In August 2009, Mojo magazine arranged for The Housemartins' original members to get together for a photo-shoot and interview, for the first time in many years, but in the interview all the members maintained that the band would not re-form.

In December 2009, Cullimore co-wrote songs for (and appeared in) a pre-school music series called The Bopps, which first showed on Nick Jr. in the UK in April 2010. Cullimore and Whitaker joined Heaton on stage during a show by Heaton and Jacqui Abbott in 2014 at Hull's The New Adelphi Club, on the stage where the band had signed their Go-Discs record contract, although it was not a Housemartins reunion. The trio performed the Housemartins hit "Me and the Farmer", and Cullimore and Heaton closed the show with a performance of "Caravan of Love".

Musical style and lyrics
The band's early releases saw them described as jangle pop, which brought comparisons with bands such as the Smiths and Aztec Camera. David Quantick, writing for Spin, described them in 1986 as playing "traditional '60s-style guitar pop overlaid with soul vocals". Cook described the band as "religious, but not Christians", and the band's repertoire included gospel songs.

Many of the band's lyrics have socialist themes, with Cook stating that "Paul realised that he hated writing about love...and that writing politically came easier to him", describing some of their songs as "angrily political".

Band Members

Final Lineup
 Paul Heaton - Vocals, Guitar, Trombone, Harmonica (1983 - 1988)
 Stan Cullimore - Guitar, Vocals (1983 - 1988)
 Norman Cook - Bass, Vocals (1985 - 1988)
 Dave Hemingway - Drums, Vocals (1987 - 1988)

Former Members
 Ted Key - Bass, Vocals (1984 - 1985)
 Justin Patrick - Drums (1985)
 Chris Lang - Drums (1985)
 Roger "Dodger" Wilde - Drums (1985)
 Hugh Whitaker - Drums (1985 - 1987)

Discography

Albums

Singles

Compilation albums
 The Housemartins Christmas Box Set (November 1986) UK #84
Now That's What I Call Quite Good (April 1988) UK #8
The Best of The Housemartins (2004,Go! Discs/Mercury Records), released in two discs  (1 CD and 1 DVD)
Live at the BBC (2006, Universal)
Soup (December 2007) UK # 15

Videography
(does not include "live" appearances on TV programmes)
 "Sheep"
 "Happy Hour"
 "Think for a Minute"
 "Caravan of Love"
 "Five Get Over Excited"
 "Me and the Farmer"
 "Build"
 "There Is Always Something There to Remind Me"
 "We're Not Deep"

Biography
 The Housemartins: Now That's What I Call Quite Good by Nick Swift (1988)

References

External links
 

English indie rock groups
British indie pop groups
Jangle pop groups
Musical groups from Kingston upon Hull
Brit Award winners
Musical groups established in 1983
Musical groups disestablished in 1988
Chrysalis Records artists
Elektra Records artists
Go! Discs Records artists
Political music groups
English socialists